Cobalt(III) fluoride is the inorganic compound with the formula . Hydrates are also known. The anhydrous compound is a hygroscopic brown solid.  It is used to synthesize organofluorine compounds.

The related cobalt(III) chloride is also known but is extremely unstable. Cobalt(III) bromide and cobalt(III) iodide have not been synthesized.

Structure

Anhydrous
Anhydrous cobalt trifluoride crystallizes in the rhombohedral group, specifically according to the aluminium trifluoride motif, with a = 527.9 pm, α = 56.97°.  Each cobalt atom is bound to six fluorine atoms in octahedral geometry, with Co–F distances of 189 pm. Each fluoride is a doubly bridging ligand.

Hydrates
A hydrate  is known.

Preparation
Cobalt trifluoride can be prepared in the laboratory by treating  with fluorine at 250 °C:
  +  3/2   →      +  
Cobalt(II) oxide (CoO) and cobalt(II) fluoride can also be converted to cobalt(III) fluoride using fluorine.

The compound can also be formed by treating  with chlorine trifluoride  or bromine trifluoride .

Reactions
 decomposes upon contact with water to give oxygen:
4   +  2 H2O →  4 HF  +  4 Co  +  O2

It reacts with fluoride salts to give the anion [CoF6]3−, which is also features high-spin, octahedral cobalt(III) center.

Applications
 is a powerful fluorinating agent. Used as slurry,  converts hydrocarbons to the perfluorocarbons:
2   +  R-H  →  2 Co  +  R-F  +  HF
Co is the byproduct.

Such reactions are sometimes accompanied by rearrangements or other reactions. The related reagent KCoF4 is more selective.

Gaseous 
In the gas phase,  is calculated to be planar in its ground state, and has a 3-fold rotation axis (symmetry notation D3h). The  ion has a ground state of 3d6 5D. The fluoride ligands split this state into, in energy order, 5A', 5E", and 5E' states. The first energy difference is small and the 5E" state is subject to the Jahn-Teller effect, so this effect needs to be considered to be sure of the ground state. The energy lowering is small and does not change the energy order. This calculation was the first treatment of the Jahn-Teller effect using calculated energy surfaces.

References

External links

National Pollutant Inventory - Cobalt fact sheet
National Pollutant Inventory - Fluoride and compounds fact sheet

Fluorides
Metal halides
Cobalt(III) compounds
Fluorinating agents